Nauvoo State Park is an Illinois state park on  in Hancock County, Illinois, United States.

References

State parks of Illinois
State Park
Protected areas on the Mississippi River
Protected areas of Hancock County, Illinois